Ipomopsis is a genus of flowering plants in the phlox family, Polemoniaceae. The annual and perennial herbs it contains are native to the Americas, particularly North America.

Species include:
Ipomopsis aggregata  (Pursh) V.E.Grant   - Scarlet gilia 
Ipomopsis arizonica  (Greene) Wherry   - Arizona firecracker (Mojave Desert)
Ipomopsis congesta (Hook.) V.E.Grant - Ballhead ipomopsis (Western North America)
Ipomopsis effusa - Baja California ipomopsis
Ipomopsis globularis - Hoosier Pass ipomopsis
Ipomopsis gunnisonii - Sand Dune ipomopsis
Ipomopsis havardii - Havard's ipomopsis
Ipomopsis laxiflora - Iron ipomopsis
Ipomopsis longiflora - Flaxflowered ipomopsis
Ipomopsis macombii - Macomb's ipomopsis
Ipomopsis macrosiphon - Longtube ipomopsis
Ipomopsis minutiflora - Littleflower ipomopsis
Ipomopsis multiflora - Manyflower ipomopsis
Ipomopsis pinnata - San Luis Mountains ipomopsis
Ipomopsis polyantha - Pagosa ipomopsis
Ipomopsis polycladon (Torr.) V.E.Grant - Manybranched ipomopsis (Western United States, Northern Mexico)
Ipomopsis pumila - Dwarf ipomopsis
Ipomopsis roseata - Rosy ipomopsis
Ipomopsis rubra (L.) Wherry  - Standing cypress 
Ipomopsis sancti-spiritus  Wilken & R.A.Fletcher  - Holy Ghost ipomopsis
Ipomopsis spicata - Spiked ipomopsis
Ipomopsis tenuifolia (A.Gray) V.E.Grant - Slenderleaf skyrocket (Baja California, Southern Arizona, Southern California)
Ipomopsis tenuituba (Rydb.) V.E.Grant - Slendertube skyrocket (Western United States)
Ipomopsis thuberi - El Paso skyrocket
Ipomopsis wrightii - Leafy skyrocket

References

Germplasm Resources Information Network (GRIN): Ipomopsis
Jepson Flora Project: Ipomopsis

 
Polemoniaceae genera
Flora of North America